Elections to Southwark Council were held in May 1978. The whole council was up for election with a 28.7% turnout. There are 25 wards rather than the previous 23 and 64 councillors rather than 70.

Election result

|}

Ward results

Abbey

Alleyn

Barset

Bellenden

Bricklayers

Browning

Brunswick

Burgess

Cathedral

Chaucer

College

Consort

Dockyard

Faraday

Friary

Liddle

Lyndhurst

Newington

Riverside

Rotherhithe

Ruskin

Rye

St Giles

The Lane

Waverley

By-Elections

The by-election was called following the death of Cllr. Siah Cox

The by-election was called following the death of Cllr. Peter Flower

The by-election was called following the death of Cllr. Enid Boxall

The by-election was called following the resignation of Cllr. Frank Brean

References

Council elections in the London Borough of Southwark
1978 London Borough council elections
20th century in the London Borough of Southwark